In physics, the Green's function (or fundamental solution) for Laplace's equation in three variables is used to describe the response of a particular type of physical system to a point source. In particular, this Green's function arises in systems that can be described by Poisson's equation, a partial differential equation (PDE) of the form

Because  is a linear differential operator, the solution  to a general system of this type can be written as an integral over a distribution of source given by :

where the Green's function for Laplace's equation in three variables  describes the response of the system at the point  to a point source located at :

Motivation
One physical system of this type is a charge distribution in electrostatics. In such a system, the electric field is expressed as the negative gradient of the electric potential, and Gauss's law in differential form applies:

Combining these expressions gives us Poisson's equation:

We can find the solution  to this equation for an arbitrary charge distribution by temporarily considering the distribution created by a point charge  located at :

In this case,

which shows that  for  will give the response of the system to the point charge . Therefore, from the discussion above, if we can find the Green's function of this operator, we can find  to be

for a general charge distribution.

Mathematical exposition
The free-space Green's function for Laplace's equation in three variables is given in terms of the reciprocal distance between two points and is known as the "Newton kernel" or "Newtonian potential".  That is to say, the solution of the equation

is

The algebraic expression of the Green's function for the three-variable Laplace equation, apart from the constant term  expressed in Cartesian coordinates shall be referred to as

Many expansion formulas are possible, given the algebraic expression for the Green's function. One of the most well-known of these, the Laplace expansion for the three-variable Laplace equation, is given in terms of the generating function for Legendre polynomials,

which has been written in terms of spherical coordinates . The less than (greater than) notation means, take the primed or unprimed spherical radius depending on which is less than (greater than) the other. The  represents the angle between the two arbitrary vectors  given by

The free-space circular cylindrical Green's function (see below) is given in terms of the reciprocal distance between two points. The expression is derived in Jackson's Classical Electrodynamics. Using the Green's function for the three-variable Laplace equation, one can integrate the Poisson equation in order to determine the potential function.  Green's functions can be expanded in terms of the basis elements (harmonic functions) which are determined using the separable coordinate systems for the linear partial differential equation.  There are many expansions in terms of special functions for the Green's function.  In the case of a boundary put at infinity with the boundary condition setting the solution to zero at infinity, then one has an infinite-extent Green's function.  For the three-variable Laplace equation, one can for instance expand it in the rotationally invariant coordinate systems which allow separation of variables.  For instance:

where

Here the expansion has been written in terms of cylindrical coordinates . See for instance Toroidal coordinates.

Using one of the Whipple formulae for toroidal harmonics we can obtain an alternative form of the Green's function

in terms for a toroidal harmonic of the first kind.

This formula was used in 1999 for astrophysical applications in a paper published in The Astrophysical Journal, published by Howard Cohl and Joel Tohline.  The above-mentioned formula is also known in the engineering community.  For instance, a paper written in the Journal of Applied Physics in volume 18, 1947 pages 562-577 shows N.G. De Bruijn and C.J. Boukamp knew of the above relationship. In fact, virtually all the mathematics found in recent papers was already done by Chester Snow. This is found in his book titled Hypergeometric and Legendre Functions with Applications to Integral Equations of Potential Theory, National Bureau of Standards Applied Mathematics Series 19, 1952. Look specifically on pages 228-263.  The article by Chester Snow, "Magnetic Fields of Cylindrical Coils and Annular Coils" (National Bureau of Standards, Applied Mathematical Series 38, December 30, 1953), clearly shows the relationship between the free-space Green's function in cylindrical coordinates and the Q-function expression. Likewise, see another one of Snow's pieces of work, titled "Formulas for Computing Capacitance and Inductance", National Bureau of Standards Circular 544, September 10, 1954, pp 13–41. Indeed, not much has been published recently on the subject of toroidal functions and their applications in engineering or physics. However, a number of engineering applications do exist. One application was published; the article was written by J.P. Selvaggi, S. Salon, O. Kwon, and M.V.K. Chari, "Calculating the External Magnetic Field From Permanent Magnets in Permanent-Magnet Motors-An Alternative Method," IEEE Transactions on Magnetics, Vol. 40, No. 5, September 2004. These authors have done extensive work with Legendre functions of the second kind and half-integral degree or toroidal functions of zeroth order. They have solved numerous problems which exhibit circular cylindrical symmetry employing the toroidal functions.

The above expressions for the Green's function for the three-variable Laplace equation are examples of single summation expressions for this Green's function.  There are also single-integral expressions for this Green's function.  Examples of these can be seen to exist in rotational cylindrical coordinates as an integral Laplace transform in the difference of vertical heights whose kernel is given in terms of the order-zero Bessel function of the first kind as

Similarly, the Green's function for the three-variable Laplace equation can be given as a Fourier integral cosine transform of the difference of vertical heights whose kernel is given in terms of the order-zero modified Bessel function of the second kind as

Rotationally invariant Green's functions for the three-variable Laplace equation
Green's function expansions exist in all of the rotationally invariant coordinate systems which are known to yield solutions to the three-variable Laplace equation through the separation of variables technique.

 cylindrical coordinates
 spherical coordinates
 Prolate spheroidal coordinates
 Oblate spheroidal coordinates
 Parabolic coordinates
 Toroidal coordinates
 Bispherical coordinates
 Flat-ring cyclide coordinates
 Flat-disk cyclide coordinates
 Bi-cyclide coordinates
 Cap-cyclide coordinates

See also 
 Newtonian potential
 Laplace expansion

References

Partial differential equations